Touchdown Radio, also known as Touchdown Radio Productions or Touchdown Radio Network, is a sports radio network specializing in live broadcasts of NCAA football. It was founded in 2007 by Gino Torretta, the 1992 Heisman Trophy winner.

Touchdown Radio broadcasts at least one major college football game every Saturday during the college football season, along with select bowl games. Torretta handles color commentary on most broadcasts. Play-by-play announcers have included Taylor Zarzour, Frank Frangie, Roxy Bernstein, Brett Dolan, and Jim Szoke.

In 2008 it was announced that Touchdown had become the national radio partner for the All American Football League. The plan called for Touchdown to air a game of the week which would be distributed nationwide on Touchdown Radio affiliates and on Sports Byline USA. However the league never launched.

References

American radio networks
College football on the radio